Jan Simonides Montanus was a Czech composer of the Renaissance era.

Birth and death
He was born in Kutná Hora, between 1530 and 1540, and died at the same place, in 1587.

Ultraquism
He was an Utraquist and a favourite author of the times.  His works represent late 16th century Utraquist polyphony.

Compositions
He was a schoolmaster at St. Barbara’s Church. Today 22 of his works are known, but only one them — the composition "Aurea Luce" — has been preserved whole, in Český Krumlov’s song collection. He composed masses with Latin lyrics, motets, and songs in both Czech and Latin.

External links 
 Composers of Kutná Hora

16th-century births
1597 deaths
16th-century Bohemian people
16th-century composers
Czech composers
Czech male composers
Renaissance composers
Male classical composers